Ralph Alan Cohen is the co-founder and Director of Mission for the American Shakespeare Center, a regional theater company located in Staunton, Virginia.  He is also the Gonder professor of Shakespeare in Performance at Mary Baldwin University. He is the author of ShakesFear and How to Cure It: A Handbook for Teaching Shakespeare. The book won the AEP's Distinguished Achievement Award and the 2007 Association of Educational Publishers Award for Best Professional Development Book.

Cohen is the recipient of Virginia's award for outstanding faculty as a former professor at James Madison University. In 2008, he won Virginia's Governor's Arts Award with Jim Warren. In 2009, he was the Theo Crosby Fellow at Shakespeare's Globe in London.  In 2014, he was the first American to receive the Globe's Sam Wanamaker Award. In 2016, he received the Distinguished Alumni Award from the Duke University Graduate School.

References

American theatre directors
Living people
American non-fiction writers
Year of birth missing (living people)
James Madison University faculty
Mary Baldwin University faculty
Duke University alumni